Los Ojos is a census-designated place (CDP) in Rio Arriba County, New Mexico, United States. Its population was 125 as of the 2010 census. Los Ojos has a post office with ZIP code 87551, which opened on February 7, 1877. The community is located near U.S. routes 64 and 84.

Description

Historically, the community has also been known as Park View. Los Ojos was founded in 1860, and a nearby colony, Park View, was established in 1876. A post office was opened in Park View in 1877, but the colony and post office were soon abandoned. The post office was reopened in 1880 in Los Ojos, but the post office kept its original name, Park View. Los Ojos thus came to be referred to on maps as Park View, but in 1971, citizens petitioned to have the name officially changed back to Los Ojos, and the petition was granted in 1972.

Geography

Demographics

Education
It is within the Chama Valley Independent Schools school district.

See also

 List of census-designated places in New Mexico

References

External links

Census-designated places in New Mexico
Census-designated places in Rio Arriba County, New Mexico